Guy Augustin Marie Jean de la Pérusse des Cars (6 May 1911 – 21 December 1993) was a best-selling French author of popular novels.

Personal life

Born in Paris on 6 May 1911, des Cars was from an aristocratic family. He was the second son of François de la Péruse, Duke of Cars (1875–1941) and Marie Thérésa Edwards (1879–1941). Cars' father was a young military attache in London when at a Victorian debutante ball he met his future wife, the daughter of the President of Chile. Cars would later be inspired by his mother in his work.

He went to school at Jesuits at Evroux. After school, his mother paid for him to become a priest. At 19, he visited his mother's family in Chile. On board ship on his way back to France, he wrote a bright little comedy, Croisiere pour dames seules ('Cruise for Unattached Ladies') which ran for a hundred performances, much to the horror of his family. They cut off his allowance, and des Cars began his career in journalism. 

It's possible he married more than once. On 12 May 1947, he married the lyric artist, Marthe Claquin.

He is the father of Jean des Cars, French journalist.

Career 
des Cars started his writing career before World War II as a journalist, and wrote many different kinds of articles, from fashion to foreign policy. He showed a keen interest in the circus and variety arts, which led him to become a street entertainer, eventually touring with Pinder Circus, with which he travelled all over Europe. Life in the circus was to provide the background for his second novel, La Dame du Cirque (1943). In the 1930s, he worked as Press Agent for the giant German Circus Gleich.

des Cars served in World War II and returned with the Croix de Guerre, and the manuscript of his first novel. After that, he published 60 popular novels, including many best-sellers with salacious covers, within the trend of pulp fiction in America. He was condemned by the intelligentsia as a 'railway bookstall novelist' – earning him the nickname of 'Guy des Gares'. He didn't care: 'Being a popular novelist is no problem for me – but being an unpopular one would be.'

He was translated into 21 languages and his work covered many taboo topics. In 1954, he released La Maudite, to be reprinted in America as The Damned one. This particular novel detailed a lesbian relationship, situating it into the canon of lesbian pulp fiction. It received a Grier Rating of A*, and was rated 'objectionable' by the National Organization for Decent Literature.

Literary works

 1946 – L'impure (1946)
 1947 – Les sept femmes (Seven Women)
 1948 – La demoiselle d'opéra
 1951 – La brute (a TV show was based on this novel; as well as the 1954 British film The Green Scarf)
 1953 – L'amour s'en va en guerre
 1954 – La maudite (The Damned One)
 1955 – L'officier sans nom
 1956 – Amour de ma vie
 1956 – La cathédrale de haine
 1957 – La tricheuse (a TV show was based on this novel)
 1958 – Le château de la juive
 1959 – Les filles de joie
 1960 – Cette étrange tendresse
 1961 – Le grand Monde
 1962 – La dame du cirque
 1963 – Sang d'Afrique
 1964 – Les sept femmes
 1965 – De cape et de plume
 1966 – L'habitude d'amour
 1967 – Le faussaire
 1968 – La révoltée
 1969 – La vipère
 1970 – L'entremetteuse
 1971 – Une certaine dame
 1972 – L'insolence de sa beauté
 1973 – La vie secrète de Dorothée Gindt
 1973 – Le donneur
 1974 – J'ose, récit autobiographique
 1975 – L'envouteuse
 1974 – Le mage et la boule de cristal
 1976 – Le mage et les lignes de la main
 1977 – Le chateau du clown
 1977 – Le mage et la bonne aventure
 1978 – Le mage et la graphologie
 1979 – La femme qui en savait trop
 1979 – Les Reines de cœur de Roumanie
 1981 – La femme sans frontière
 1983 – Le crime de Mathilde
 1984 – Le faiseur de morts
 1984 – La voleuse
 1985 – Je t'aimerai éternellement
 1990 – La femme d'argent

Others books published with unknown dates:

 La coupable – Guilty
 La femme objet
 La justicière
 La mère porteuse
 La vengeresse
 La visiteuse
 Le boulevard des illusions – Illusions boulevard
 Le mage et le pendule – This book is part of a serie – after Le mage et la boule de cristal, written in 1974 et before Mage et les lignes de la main, written in 1976.
 Le train du Père Noël – Santa Claus' Train
 L'homme au double visage – Double face Man – (a TV show was based on this novel)

External links
 Video- Guy des Cars in 1968, he spoke about his life and his career on Swiss Television.
  List of des Cars' books in pocket size
  IMDb's list of novels that became TV shows

References

1911 births
1993 deaths
Writers from Paris
French crime fiction writers
20th-century French novelists
20th-century French male writers
French male novelists
House of Pérusse des Cars